George Thomas Bolt  (16 June 1900 – 20 March 1971) was a New Zealand public servant. He served as chairman of the Public Service Commission in New Zealand from 1953 to 1958. He was secretary of the Commission from 1936, and assistant commissioner from 1944.

Born in London, England, on 16 June 1900, Bolt was the son of George Henry and Emma Sarah Bolt. After the family migrated to New Zealand, he was educated at Wellington College, and qualified as an accountant. He joined the Public Service as a cadet in 1917. He died in Wellington Hospital, aged 70 years.

In 1953, Bolt was awarded the Queen Elizabeth II Coronation Medal. In the 1955 Queen's Birthday Honours, he was appointed a Companion of the Order of St Michael and St George, in recognition of his service as chairman of the Public Service Commission.

References

Obituary Dominion 23 March 1971 (page 4)

1900 births
1971 deaths
New Zealand Companions of the Order of St Michael and St George
People educated at Wellington College (New Zealand)
New Zealand public servants
English emigrants to New Zealand